Hakham Ezra Reuben Dangoor  (1848–1930) was the Chief Rabbi of Baghdad from 1923 to 1926, and the founder of the first publishing company in Baghdad.

Early life
Ezra Sasson ben Reuven Dangoor was born in 1848 in Baghdad, Iraq. He was educated in Baghdad, where he studied under Rabbi Abdallah Somekh.

Career
Dangoor worked as a ritual slaughterer and ritual circumciser, before from 1880 to 1886 working as the scribe in charge of writing documents issued by the Baghdad's Bet Din.

Dangoor was the Chief Rabbi of Rangoon, Burma from 1893 or 1894, but had to return to Baghdad in 1895 due to ill health.

In 1904, Dangoor opened the first printing press in Baghdad, which printed Arabic textbooks as well as books in Hebrew. Dangoor was the author of several books and commentaries on the Torah.

From 1923 to 1926, Dangoor was Chief Rabbi of Baghdad.

Personal life
Dangoor had five children: Sion, Abdulla Joseph, Farha (who married Shaul Basri), Eliahou and Moshe.

Death and legacy
Dangoor died in 1930. He was the grandfather of Sir Naim Eliahou Dangoor (1914–2015), and of the wife of the latter and Iraq's first beauty queen, Renée Dangoor, and also the great-grandfather of the philanthropist David Dangoor.

References

1848 births
1930 deaths
19th-century Iraqi rabbis
20th-century Iraqi rabbis
Rabbis from Baghdad
Mohels